The men's 25 metre rapid fire pistol shooting event at the 2011 Pan American Games was held on October 21 and  22 at the Pan American Shooting Polygon in Guadalajara. The defending Pan American Games champion is Leuris Pupo of the Cuba.

The event consisted of two rounds: a qualifier and a final. In the qualifier, each shooter fired 60 shots with a pistol at 25 metres distance. Scores for each shot were in increments of 1, with a maximum score of 10. Targets were presented in series of 5. Each shooter was presented with 12 series, and had a sharply limited time to complete each. Four of the series had to be completed in 8 seconds apiece, four more within 6 seconds, and four within 4 seconds.

The top 6 shooters in the qualifying round moved on to the final round. There, they fired an additional 20 shots. These shots scored in increments of .1, with a maximum score of 10.9. They were presented in four series of 5 shots each, with each series being limited to 4 seconds to make all five shots. The total score from all 80 shots was used to determine final ranking.

Schedule
All times are Central Standard Time (UTC-6).

Records
The existing world and Pan American Games records were as follows.

Results

Qualification round

Final

References

Shooting at the 2011 Pan American Games